Jana overlaeti is a moth in the family Eupterotidae. It was described by Lucien A. Berger in 1980. It is found in the Democratic Republic of the Congo.

References

Janinae
Moths described in 1980